Whinney is a surname. Notable people with the surname include:

 Bob Whinney (1909–1992), Royal Navy officer
 Margaret Whinney (1897–1975), English art historian 
 Michael Whinney (1930–2017), Church of England bishop
 Thomas Bostock Whinney (1860–1926), English architect